Microdipoena saltuensis, is a species of spider of the genus Microdipoena. It is endemic to Sri Lanka.

See also
 List of Mysmenidae species

References

Mysmenidae
Endemic fauna of Sri Lanka
Spiders of Asia
Spiders described in 1895